Gnawa music (Ar. ) is a body of Moroccan religious songs and rhythms. Its well-preserved heritage combines ritual poetry with traditional music and dancing. The music is performed at lila, communal nights of celebration dedicated to prayer and healing guided by the Gnawa maalem, or master musician, and their group of musicians and dancers. Though many of the influences that formed this music can be traced to West African kingdoms, its traditional practice is concentrated in Morocco. Gnawa music has spread to many other countries in Africa and Europe, such as France.

The history of the Gnawi is closely related to the famous Moroccan royal "Black Guard", which became today the Royal Guard of Morocco. 

Moroccan and Hausa cultures are connected both religiously, as both are Malikite Muslims, with many Moroccan spiritual schools active in Hausaland, and artistically, with Gnawa music being the prime example of typical Hausa music within Morocco.

Etymology
The word "Gnawa", plural of "Gnawi", is taken to be derived from the Hausa demonym "Kanawa" for the residents of Kano, the capital of the Hausa-Fulani Emirate, which was under Morocco influence  (Opinion of Essaouira Gnawa Maalems, Maalem Sadiq, Abdallah Guinia, and many others). The Moroccan language often replaces "K" with "G", which is how the Kanawa, or Hausa people, were called Gnawa in Morocco.

Music

In a Gnawa song, one phrase or a few lines are repeated over and over, so the song may last a long time. In fact, a song may last several hours non-stop. However, what seems to the uninitiated to be one long song is actually a series of chants describing the various spirits (in Arabic mlouk (sing. melk)), so what seems to be a 20-minute piece may be a whole series of pieces – a suite for Sidi Moussa, Sidi Hamou, Sidi Mimoun or others. Because they are suited for adepts in a state of trance, they go on and on, and have the effect of provoking a trance from different angles.

The melodic language of the stringed instrument is closely related to their vocal music and to their speech patterns, as is the case in much African music. It is a language that emphasizes on the tonic and fifth, with quavering pitch-play, especially pitch-flattening, around the third, the fifth, and sometimes the seventh.

Gnawa music is characterized by instrumentation. The  has strong historical and musical links to West African lutes like the Hausa , a direct ancestor of the banjo.

The rhythms of the Gnawa, like their instruments, are distinctive. Gnawa is particularly characterized by interplay between triple and duple meters. The "big bass drums" mentioned by Schuyler are not typically featured in a more traditional setting.

The Gnawa also use large drums called  in their ritual music.

Gnawa  players use a technique which 19th century American minstrel banjo instruction manuals identify as "brushless drop-thumb frailing". The "brushless" part means the fingers do not brush several strings at once to make chords. Instead, the thumb drops repeatedly in a rhythmic pattern against the freely vibrating bass string, producing a throbbing drone, while the first two or three fingers of the same (right) hand pick out percussive patterns in a drum-like, almost telegraphic, manner.

Rituals

The ceremony recreates the first sacrifice and the genesis of the universe by the evocation of the seven main manifestations of the divine demiurgic activity.

During the ceremony, the clairvoyant determines the accessories and clothing as it becomes ritually necessary.

The  are abstract entities that gather a number of similar jinn (genie spirits). The participants enter a trance state in which they may perform spectacular dances. By means of these dances, participants negotiate their relationships with the  either placating them if they have been offended or strengthening an existing relationship.  The  are evoked by seven musical patterns, seven melodic and rhythmic cells, who set up the seven suites that form the repertoire of dance and music of the Gnawa ritual. During these seven suites, seven different types of incense are burned and the dancers are covered by veils of seven different colours.

Each  is accompanied by its specific colour, incense, rhythm and dance. These entities, treated like "presences" (called , Arabic: حضرة) that the consciousness meets in ecstatic space and time, are related to mental complexes, human characters, and behaviors. The aim of the ritual is to reintegrate and to balance the main powers of the human body, made by the same energy that supports the perceptible phenomena and divine creative activity.
  

Almost all Moroccan brotherhoods, such as the Issawa or the Hamadsha, relate their spiritual authority to a saint. The ceremonies begin by reciting that saint's written works or spiritual prescriptions (Arabic: حزب) in Arabic. In this way, they assert their role as spiritual descendants of the founder, giving themselves the authority to perform the ritual.

Gnawa music today

During the last few decades, Gnawa music has been modernizing and thus become more profane. However, there are still many privately organized  that conserve the music's sacred, spiritual status.

Within the framework of the Gnaoua World Music Festival of Essaouira ("Gnaoua and Musics of the World"), the Gnawa play in a profane context with slight religious or therapeutic dimensions. Instead, in this musical expression of their cultural art, they share stages with other musicians from around the world. As a result, Gnawa music has taken a new direction by fusing its core spiritual music with genres like jazz, blues, reggae, and hip-hop. For four days every June, the festival welcomes musicians that come to participate, exchange and mix their own music with Gnawa music, creating one of the largest public festivals in Morocco. Since its debut in 1998, the free concerts have drawn an audience that has grown from 20,000 to over 200,000 in 2006, including 10,000 visitors from around the world.

Past participants have included Randy Weston, Adam Rudolph, The Wailers, Pharoah Sanders, Keziah Jones, Byron Wallen, Omar Sosa, Doudou N'Diaye Rose, and the Italian trumpet player Paolo Fresu.

There are also projects such as "The Sudani Project", a jazz/gnawa dialogue between saxophonist/composer Patrick Brennan, Gnawi maâlem Najib Sudani, and drummer/percussionist/vocalist Nirankar Khalsa. Brennan has pointed out that the metal qraqeb and gut bass strings of the guembri parallel the cymbal and bass in jazz sound.

In the 1990s, young musicians from various backgrounds and nationalities started to form modern Gnawa bands. Gnawa Impulse from Germany, Mehdi Qamoum aka Medicament (The cure) from Morocco, Bab L' Bluz with members from France and Morocco, and Gnawa Diffusion from Algeria are some examples. These groups offer a rich mix of musical and cultural backgrounds, fusing their individual influences into a collective sound. They have woven elements of rap, reggae, jazz, blues, rock and rai into a vibrant musical patchwork.

These projects incorporating Gnawa and Western musicians are essentially Gnawa fusions.

List of Gnawa maâlems

Mahmoud Guinia ("the King") or Gania – Moroccan musician (b. 1951, d. August 2, 2015). He played with Pharoah Sanders and Carlos Santana, among many others. Guitarist Jimi Hendrix spent a few months in his house in Essaouira to take lessons. He is the son of the late Maâllem Boubker Gania, and his two brothers Abdelah and Mokhtar are also distinguished maâllemin. The Gania family also includes Zaida Gania, a very popular medium and clairvoyant at the nights of trance (leelas) as well as the head of a group of female gnawas, The Haddarate of Essaouira.
Brahim Belkane ("The traditionalist") – He has played with Led Zeppelin, Robert Plant, Adam Rudolph, Randy Weston, and Jimmy Page. He says: "There are many colours on earth: red, green, blue, yellow. You have to find these when you play, to be bright like the sun."
 Hamid El Kasri – He now lives in Rabat but his origins are in the northern town Ksar El Kbir, thus the nickname Kasri (i.e. the one from Ksar). He is one of the biggest stars on stage and is particularly renowned in Morocco for his voice. In his youth Hamid was associated with the gnawa scene in Tangier and masters such as Abdelwahab "Stitou". He began his apprenticeship at the age of seven. He fuses the music of the north with that of the south: gharbaoui from Rabat, marsaoui from Essaouira and soussi or Berber from the south of Morocco. He has played with Jacob Collier and Snarky Puppy.
H'mida Boussou ("The grand master") – As a child, H'mida immersed himself in Gnawi culture as taught to him by the Maâlem Ahmed Oueld Dijja, and became a maâlem himself at the age of 16. He also worked with Maâlem Sam from 1962 to 1968. Maalem H'mida Boussou died on 17 February 2007, but his son, Maalem Hassan Boussou continues the tradition and played a concert in homage to his late father at the 10th Essaouira Gnaoua and World Music Festival in June 2007.
Chérif Regragui ("The communicator") – He became a maâlem by the age of 18. He worked with Tayeb Saddiki in theatre and he was behind the group Taghada.
Mahjoub Khalmous – His skills took him to many festivals in Europe. In 1993 he formed his own group and became a maâlem. He has worked for several years with Bertrand Hell, head of the anthropology department at Besançon University in France.
Allal Soudani ("The dreamer") – His grandparents M'Barkou and Barkatou were brought from Sudan as slaves. "When I play I no longer feel my body, I empty myself. And when I reach the state of trance I become nothing more than a leaf on a tree blowing at the mercy of the wind," he says, describing his trance moments.
Abdellah El Gourd – He learned Gnawa music as a young man while working as a radio engineer in his hometown of Tangier. He has collaborated with jazz musicians Randy Weston and Archie Shepp and blues musician Johnny Copeland. With Weston, he co-produced The Splendid Master Gnawa Musicians of Morocco, which received a 1996 Grammy Award nomination for Best World Music Album.
Omar Hayat ("The showman") – He was taught by Mahmoud Guinea and the late Maâllem Ahmed. He formed his own group in 1991. His style is particularly influenced by reggae, but Omar Hayat nonetheless plays true gnawa and is a source of inspiration for the young gnaoui in Essaouira. He participated at the festival of Avignon and has also been working and touring with the German circus Afrika! Afrika!
Abelkebir Merchane (also known as Cheb) – He is from an Arab family, none of whom are gnawa. His style is a mixture of marsaoui (Essaouira) and Marrakchi (Marrakech). He was taught by Maâllem Layaachi Baqbou. His son Hicham is also a gnawa master.
Abdeslam Alikkane and Tyour gnawa – He is a Berber from the region of Agadir. He learned to play the krakeb at the age of nine. He is particularly interested in the healing aspect of gnawa. He has performed at many international festivals, playing with Peter Gabriel, Gilberto Gil (currently Brazil's minister of Culture) and Ray Lema.
Abderrahman Paca – He is one a founding member of the group Nass El Ghiwane. In 1966 he briefly joined the Living Theatre, then two years later met Jimi Hendrix.
Mohamed Kouyou – In 1984 he played at the opening of the Moroccan Pavilion at Disney World. He also plays in Essaouira's gnawa festival.
Mokhtar Gania – Son of Maâlem Boubker. He is the younger brother of Mahmoud. He played at the Roskilde Festival in Denmark in 2003, sharing the stage with Bill Laswell, Jah Wobble, Gigi, Sussan Deyhim and others.
Mohamed Daoui – He teaches the younger generation of future maâlems, for which he has a widespread reputation.
Abdelkader Benthami – He owes his education to maâlems such as Zouitni. He lives in Casablanca, and showed his strength on albums such as Bill Laswell's Night Spirit Masters. His sons are both masters, and the youngest, Abderrahim, debuted in 2007 at the Festival d'Essaouira.
Si Mohamed Ould Lebbat – At the age of 18 he began to play with Maâlem Sam, whom he accompanied to festivals in France.
Ahmed Bakbou – He has worked with maâlems including Ba Ahmed Saasaa, El Hachimi Ould Mama, Homan Ould el Ataar, and Si Mohamed Ould el Fernatchi. He is the first son of Maâllem Layaachi Baqbou, and he is known as "the talking gimbri". Although he sings, he often plays the gimbri with close friends such as Abdelkebir Merchane or his brothers Moustapha and Aziz singing.
Essaïd Bourki – His origins are in the south of Morocco. He performed with his group in Belgium in 1990.
Abdellah Guinea ("The Marley") – He became a maâlem at the age of 16. His nickname is due to his dreadlocks and fondness for reggae. He is the middle son of Maâllem Boubker Gania.
Mohamed Chaouki – Formerly a horse trainer who worked in the stud farms of Rabat. At the age of 19 he became a maâlem. He formed a group with his brother, sons and nephews with whom he has performed in Europe 18 times.
Saïd Boulhimas – He was the youngest Gnawi to play at the 7th (2004) gnawa festival. Saïd was taught by Abdelah Gania and is almost considered the son of the maâllem. He won the Festival de Jeunes Talents (Festival of young talents) in 2006 and is part of the French/Moroccan Band Of Gnawa with Louis Bertignac and Loy Erlich.
Hassan Hakmoun – By the age of four, he was performing alongside snake charmers and fire-breathers on Marrakech streets. His mother is known throughout the city as a mystic healer. He worked with Peter Gabriel. He is currently based in New York City.
Fath-Allah Cherquaoui (Fath-Allah Laghrizmi) – One of the youngest Masters of Gnawa music, Fath-Allah was born in 1984 into a well-known family in Marrakech, Morocco. His eyes were opened to the ceremonies of Gnawa music by his grandmother, Lmqadma Lhouaouia. Thus, the entire family, including young children, developed a deep appreciation and interest in this genre of spiritual music. By the age of 19, his elder cousin, Maallem Lahouaoui, became a Master and began to play in the ceremonies for their grandmother. At seven years old, Fath-Allah was able to sing nearly all of the ritual repertoire, and play the qraqeb (iron castanets). Five years later, he and his younger brother purchased their first , and he began learning and practicing finger placement, as well as how to distinguish the correct tones. Although his father advised him to spend more time on his schoolwork, and cautioned him against the dangers and hardships of the music industry, Fath-Allah remained dedicated to teaching himself the instruments and music of Gnawa. After some time, he was invited to join his cousin Maallem Lahouaoui’s band, playing the castanets, dancing and singing. His chance finally came on a night when his cousin asked him to stand in for him and finish playing what was left of the ceremonial songs. It was the first time Fath-Allah had ever played in front of a crowd, and during an actual Gnawa ceremony. The audience was amazed at how the youngest member of the band could so easily replace the Master, and actually play as well as he and many other Masters. This was the beginning of the Maallem Fath-Allah. His favourite Masters include: Maallem Lahouaoui, Maallem Mustapha Baqbou, Maallem Hmida Boussou and Maallem Abd Elkader Amil
Mohamed Errebbaa One of the youngest masters, originally from Rabat, he started at a young age when he moved to Casablanca and grew up attending ceremonies of great masters such as Maalem Hmida boussou ,Maalem Abdelkader Benthami. He spent many years learning with different masters such as Maalem Abderrahim Benthami and Maalem Said Oughassal before he moved to Essaouira and spent a few years with Maalem Mokhtar Gania. Mohamed has always worked on different types of music and collaborations besides his traditional ceremonies.He moved to the UK in 2020 and is based in Bristol.

Notes

References
Ibiblio.org: Gnawa Stories: Mystical Musician Healers from Morocco
gnawa at the Moroccan ministry of Communication website
WorldMusicCentral.org
PTWMusic.com: gnawa by Chouki El Hamel at Duke University December 1, 2000
arab-art.org: article about Gnawa from the "Centre de collecte et de recherche Arab-art" (the description above comes from this side)

External links
Essaouira at WorldMusicCentral.org
gnawa at the Catholic University of America, D.C.
"The Gnawa and Their Lila: An Afro-Maghrebi Ritual Tradition" by Timothy D. Fuson
Dar Gnawa Website
A website dedicated to Gnawa Music (fr)
Music of Morocco: The Paul Bowles Recordings-Contains recordings, images and photos of Gnawa music recorded in 1959

Moroccan styles of music
Algerian styles of music

North African music
West African music

de:Gnawa
fr:Gnaoua